Juaboso District is one of the nine districts in Western North Region, Ghana. Originally it was formerly part of the then-larger Juaboso-Bodi District in August 2004, which was created from the former Sefwi-Bibiani District Council, until the southeast part of the district was split off to create Bodi District on 28 June 2012; thus the remaining part has been renamed as Juaboso District. The district assembly is located in the northwest part of Western North Region and has Juaboso as its capital town.

Juaboso City
It is about 65 kilometers north west of the district capital Wiawso. It is also 360 kilometers north west of Takoradi on the Atlantic Ocean coast and 225 kilometres south west of Kumasi, capital of the Ashanti Region.

Geography
Juaboso District lies between latitude 6° 6'N and 7°N, and longitude 2°40'W and 3°15'W. To the north are the Bia East, Bia West and Asunafo North Municipal Districts. Its eastern neighbours are the Asunafo South and Bodi Districts. The Suaman District lies south and the La Cote d’lvoire is to the west.

Sub-district structures
Juaboso District has four area councils: Kofikrom-Proso, Asempaneye, Benchema-Nkatieso and Boinzan.

Demographics
The population based on the 2010 population and housing census was 58,435. This was made up of 29,742 males and 28,693 females.

References

Districts of the Western North Region